In chess, a desperado is a piece that is (in the first meaning) either en prise or trapped, but captures an enemy piece before it is itself captured in order to compensate the loss a little, or (in the second meaning) is used as a sacrifice that will result in stalemate if it is captured. The former case can arise in a situation where both sides have  pieces, in which case these pieces are used to win material prior to being captured. A desperado in the latter case is usually a rook or a queen; such a piece is sometimes also called crazy or mad (e.g. crazy rook).

Examples of the first definition

Petrosian versus Fischer

A simple example illustrating the first definition comes from a 1958 game between future world champions Tigran Petrosian and Bobby Fischer (see diagram). White had just captured the e5-pawn with his knight on f3. The white knight can be taken, but White's move also opened a discovered attack on the black knight on h5. If Black takes the knight, then 13.Qxh5 leaves him a pawn down. To avoid this, Black sacrificed the h5-knight, capturing a pawn with tempo on the rook:

12... Nxg3 13. hxg3 Bxe5

Fischer later said 13...dxe5 would have been better ; the game ended in a draw.

Bogolyubov versus Schmid

A classic example of the first definition is Bogolyubov–Schmid, West German championship, Bad Pyrmont 1949. In the position shown, Schmid played the surprising  5... Nxe4!?, with the point that 6.Nxe4 would be met by 6...Qe7 7.f3 d5, and Black will regain the  piece. According to the Encyclopedia of Chess Openings, White can then gain a small advantage with 8.Bb5 Bd7 9.Bxc6 bxc6 10.0-0 dxe4 11.fxe4! g6 (or 11...0-0-0 12.Qf3) 12.Qf3 Bg7 13.c3 0-0 14.Bf4 c5 15.Nb3 Bc6 16.Qg3! Instead of 7.f3, Tartakower and du Mont recommend 7.Nb5 Qxe4+ 8.Be2 Kd8 9.0-0 "with compensations for the mislaid pawn" .

Instead, play continued 6. Nxc6 Nxc3! initiating a sequence of desperado moves, where each player keeps capturing with his knight, rather than pausing to capture the opponent's knight. Nxd8! White must also continue in desperado fashion, since 7.bxc3? bxc6 would leave Black a pawn up. 7... Nxd1 Again the desperado move is forced, since 7...Kxd8?? 8.bxc3 would leave Black a queen down. 8. Nxf7 Since 8.Kxd1 Kxd8 would leave White a pawn down, the knight continues capturing. 8... Nxf2 Still continuing in desperado fashion, in preference to 8...Kxf7 9.Kxd1 with material equality. 9. Nxh8 Nxh1. Between them, the desperado knights have captured thus far two queens, two rooks, two knights, and three pawns. The complete score of the game:

1. e4 e5 2. Nf3 Nc6 3. Nc3 Nf6 4. d4 exd4 5. Nxd4 Nxe4!? 6. Nxc6 Nxc3 7. Nxd8 Nxd1 8. Nxf7 Nxf2 9. Nxh8 Nxh1 10. Bd3 Bc5 11. Bxh7 Nf2 12. Bf4 d6 13. Bg6+ Kf8 14. Bg3 Ng4 15. Nf7? (Better is 15.Bd3 followed by Ng6+ "with a probable draw" .) 15... Ne3 16. Kd2 Bf5! 17. Ng5?? (Bogoljubov probably saw 17.Bxf5 Nxf5 18.Ng5 Be3+ wins, and played Ng5 in desperation; however, 17.Bxf5 Nxf5 18.Rf1 was possible) 17... Bxg6 18. Ne6+ Ke7 19. Nxc5 Nxc2! (The desperado knight strikes again, this time with deadly effect. Not 19...dxc5? 20.Kxe3 with equality.) 20. Bh4+ Ke8 21. Ne6 Kd7 22. Nf4 Nxa1 23. Nxg6 Re8 24. Bf2 Nc2! 25. Nf4 (If 25.Kxc2, Re2+ followed by ...Rxf2 wins.) 25... Nb4 (The knight departs, having captured in its 13 moves White's queen, both rooks, a knight and three pawns. Its White counterpart captured the queen, a rook, both bishops, a knight, and two pawns in its 14 moves.) 0–1

Tal versus Keres

Another example of this type of desperado is Tal–Keres, Candidates Tournament, Curaçao 1962 (see diagram).

Seeing that White's knight on d4 is unprotected, Keres offered to simplify the position with 18... Nd3!, when 19.Bxd3 Bxd4 20.Rb1? would allow 20...Qf6!  White's b- and f-pawns. Instead, Tal went in for complications with 19. Nc6? Nxf2!, when either 20.Kxf2 Qb6+ or 20.Nxd8 Nxd1 21.Nxf7 Nxb2 22.Nxd6 Nc4! 23.Nxc4 Bxa1 would leave Black with a material advantage.

Tal tried:

20. Qf3? Nxh3+! 21. Kh2

If White captures the knight, 21...Qb6+ regains the piece and leaves Black with a won game.

21... Be5+! 22. Nxe5 dxe5 23. Rad1

If 23.gxh3, Qxd2.

23... Nf4!

Now 24.Bxf4 is met by 24...Qh4+. Black won .

Examples of the second definition

Pilnick versus Reshevsky

One of the best known examples of sacrificing a desperado piece to achieve stalemate is the game between Carl Pilnick and Sammy Reshevsky, US Championship 1942 (see diagram). After:

92... g4?? 93. Qf2!

the white queen is a desperado piece: Black will lose if he doesn't capture it, but its capture results in stalemate.

Evans versus Reshevsky

Another of the best known examples involves a swindle in a game by Larry Evans versus Samuel Reshevsky. Evans sacrificed his queen on move 49 and offered his rook on move 50. White's rook has been called the eternal rook. Capturing it results in stalemate, but otherwise it stays on the seventh  and checks Black's king ad infinitum.

47. h4! Re2+ 48. Kh1 Qxg3?? 49. Qg8+! Kxg8 50. Rxg7+

Either a draw by agreement will occur or a draw by threefold repetition or the fifty-move rule can eventually be claimed  .

The game was called "The Swindle of the Century".

Reshevsky versus Geller

Reshevsky also fell into a stalemating trap against Efim Geller in the Zürich 1953 Candidates Tournament. After 53... Rf3+! (diagram) 54.Kxf3 would be stalemate. If 54.Kg2, then 54...Rxg3+! winning a crucial pawn; again, White could not take the rook without resulting in stalemate.

The game continued:

54. Ke2 Rxg3 55. Rxf5+ Kxh4

and the players agreed to a draw a few moves later.

In light of the three aforementioned Reshevsky games, the Russian analyst Verkhovsky observed that Reshevsky apparently suffered from stalemate blindness every 11 years.

Keres versus Fischer

Another famous game saved by the possibility of stalemate is Keres–Fischer, Curaçao 1962. Although Fischer avoided the stalemating lines, he allowed Keres to draw by perpetual check instead.  In the diagrammed position, Keres played the  72. Qe5!!  Fischer commented: 
What's this? He makes no attempt to stop me from queening!? Gradually my excitement subsided.  The more I studied the situation, the more I realized Black had no win.

Now if 72... g1=Q, 73.Bf5+ Kg8 (73... Kh6?? 74.Qh8#) 74.Qe8+ Kg7 75.Qe7+ Kg8 (75...Kh8?? 76.Qh7#) 76.Qe8+ draws by repetition; if 72...Qf2+, 73.Kh3 g1=Q 74.Bf5+ Kh6 75.Qf6+ Kh5 76.Bg6+! Qxg6 77.Qg5+!! and either capture is stalemate. The game continued:

72... Qh1+ 73. Bh3

Now if 73...g1=Q, 74.Qh5+ Kg7 75.Qg6+! and either capture of the queen results in stalemate (see analysis diagram) – otherwise the white queen keeps checking the black king: 75...Kh8 76.Qh6+ Kg8 77.Qg6+! Kf8 78.Qf6+ Ke8 79.Qe6+, and Black must repeat moves with 79...Kf8, since 79...Kd8?? runs into 80.Qd7# .

73... Qxh3+ 74. Kxh3 g1=Q 75. Qe7+ Kh8 76. Qf8+ Kh7 77. Qf7+ ½–½ .

Tilberger versus Drelikiewicz

Sometimes it is possible for the inferior side to sacrifice two or three pieces in rapid succession to achieve a stalemate.  An example is seen in the game Tilberger–Drelikiewicz, Poland 1970 (see diagram).

Black saved the draw with:

1... h3+! 2. Kxh3 Qf5+! 3. Qxf5

Not 3.Kg2? Qxd7.

3... Rxg3+! 4. Kh4 Rg4+!

Korchnoi versus Vaganian

In Korchnoi–Vaganian, Skellefteå 1989, a similar three-piece sacrifice might have enabled Vaganian to save the game. From the position diagrammed, Vaganian played:

35... Qxc2+? 36. Kh3 Qa4 37. Kh4

Jacob Aagaard notes that now "White had a winning endgame, which Korchnoi indeed won."

Aagaard instead recommends 35... b6!!, when the natural 36. Qxc6 would be met by 36... Ne3+! 37. Rxe3 Qf1+! (analysis diagram) 38. Kxf1 stalemate .

Korn versus Pitschak

In Korn–Pitschak, Brno 1936, White's desperado queen and rook saved the draw despite White's apparently mobile e-pawns. In the position illustrated, Black appeared to be winning after:

1... dxe2!

in light of 2.Qxd4 exf1=Q+ or 2.Qxe2 Qh4+ 3.Kg1 Qh2#. Instead, Korn played:

2. Rf8+! Kxf8 3. Qf5+ Ke8

3...Kg8? 4.Qf7+ Kh8 5.Qf8#

4. Qf7+ Kd8 5. Qf8+! Ne8 6. Qe7+! (diagram)

Now 6...Kxe7 is stalemate, while 6...Kc8 loses to 7.Qb7+ Kd8 8.e7#  .

Hegde versus Palatnik

This endgame position is from a game between Ravi Gopal Hegde and Semon Palatnik, Kozhikode 1988. The position appeared in the endgame section of Chess Informant 45. Black  in this position but had an easy draw:

59... Bg7! 60. Rh4 Bd4!

(threatening 61...Bxa7), etc. .

Capturing the bishop results in a stalemate, allowing 61...Bxa7 is a draw, and 61.Rh7 Bg7 leads to a repetition of position.

Vasilevich versus Kosteniuk

Now (see diagram) the game ended with:

56. Qg4+!

If Black captures the queen, it is stalemate. If Black instead plays 56...Kh6, then 57.Qg6+! forces Black to capture the queen.

Instead of 55...Nf3??, 55...Qc3+ followed by 56...Nf3 would have allowed Black to keep her decisive advantage.

Ponziani study

Black draws after :
1... Rh7+ 2. Kg5 Rg7+ 3. Kh6 Rh7+! 
Capturing the rook results in stalemate.
4. Kg5 Rg7+ 5. Kf6 
If 5.Kf5 then 5...Rf7+; and then if 6.Ke5 then 6...Re7.
5... Rg6+! 
Capturing the rook results in stalemate.

References

Bibliography

Šahovski Informator, Belgrade. Encyclopedia of Chess Openings, Vol. C (1997), at 271 n.26.

Further reading

 Another example of a desperado piece from Pein-de Firmian, Bermuda 1995, is on page 35. The game may be played over online here.
 Another example of a desperado piece from an actual game is on page 124 (Chris Ward versus James Plaskett, 1993).

Chess tactics